Waterfront is a 1944 American film from PRC Pictures directed by Steve Sekely.

Plot 
In San Francisco during World War II, Dr. Carl Decker (J. Carrol Naish) is a local Nazi spy leader undercover as an optometrist. While he is walking on the San Francisco waterfront at night, his decoder book and list of West Coast spies are stolen by the waterfront thug, Adolph Mertz. Victor Marlow comes to town, contacts Decker for his next assignment but the message he has is undecipherable without the book. 
It is a race to recover the book by two opposing teams: Decker and Marlow, and Zimmerman and Kramer; and a race to find a serial murderer.

Cast 
John Carradine as Victor Marlow
J. Carrol Naish as Dr. Carl Decker
Maris Wrixon as Freda Hauser, daughter
Edwin Maxwell as Max Kramer
Terry Frost as Jerry Donovan, Freda's boyfriend)
John Bleifer as Oscar Zimmerman, owner—Anchor Cafe
Marten Lamont as Mike Gorman
Olga Fabian as Mrs Emma Hauser as rooming house operator
Claire Rochelle as Maisie
Billy Nelson as Butch
 as Adolph Mertz, waterfront thug

References

External links 

1944 films
1944 romantic drama films
American black-and-white films
American romantic drama films
American spy films
American war drama films
Films directed by Steve Sekely
Films set in San Francisco
Producers Releasing Corporation films
War romance films
World War II spy films
1940s English-language films
1940s American films